Connorville may refer to:

Connorville, Michigan
Connorville, Ohio, an unincorporated community in Jefferson County